Ali Kavuma (born 30 May 1967) is a Ugandan weightlifter. He competed at the 1988 Summer Olympics and the 1996 Summer Olympics.

References

1967 births
Living people
Ugandan male weightlifters
Olympic weightlifters of Uganda
Weightlifters at the 1988 Summer Olympics
Weightlifters at the 1996 Summer Olympics
Place of birth missing (living people)